Cornelis August Wilhelm Hirschman (16 February 1877 – 26 June 1951), known as Carl Anton Wilhelm Hirschman, was a Dutch banker, co-founder of FIFA in 1904 and the 2nd General Secretary of FIFA, serving from 1906 to 1931. In 1912 he was also one of the founders of the Dutch Olympic Committee (NOC).

When FIFA-president Daniel Burley Woolfall died in 1918, Hirschman kept the organization from falling apart, almost single-handedly and at his own costs, operating from his offices in Amsterdam. He was FIFA's interim president until Jules Rimet was elected its third president in March 1921.

After the Crash of 1929 Hirschman's stock trading company went bankrupt and the money he had invested for the NOC and FIFA was mostly lost. Hirschman unexpectedly resigned from both NOC and FIFA in 1931.

See also
United Passions, a 2014 film starring Fisher Stevens as Hirschman.

References

1877 births
1951 deaths
Dutch bankers
Dutch football chairmen and investors
FIFA officials
People from Medan